Virginia Bush Nature Reserve is a 38 hectare coastal bush reserve in the suburb of Durban North, Durban, South Africa.  The reserve is currently under the auspices of the Durban Metropolitan Open Space System (D'MOSS).

History 
Previously natural grassland, the area was once used for market gardening and military purposes, but is now a demarcated municipal nature reserve. The area is in the process of being proclaimed a national nature reserve.

Flora and fauna

Birds 
The following birds can be in Virginia Bush: the natal robin, bluebilled firefinch, boubou shrike, bush shrike, flycatcher, green twinspot, grey waxbill, purple crested-lourie and the whitebrowed robin.

Mammals 
Dwarf mongoose, red and white duiker and spotted genets are known to inhabit the area.

Vegetation 
Wild hibiscus, natal figs and milkwood trees are found in the reserve.  Many of the species of vegetation are alien.

References 

Nature reserves in South Africa